"Burn Your Name" is the second single off the band's seventh and final album Golden Rule. The song was written by Powderfinger and the music video features the band in Thailand.

Music video
The music video was filmed during the Yi Ping festival, part of the Loy Krathong festival held on the 12th full moon every year. Rice paper lanterns are lit and fill the night sky like a constellation.

Track listing

Charts

References 

Powderfinger songs
2009 songs
Universal Records singles
Songs written by Bernard Fanning
Songs written by Jon Coghill
Songs written by John Collins (Australian musician)
Songs written by Ian Haug
Songs written by Darren Middleton